Jake Cousins (born July 14, 1994) is an American professional baseball pitcher for the Milwaukee Brewers of Major League Baseball (MLB). He was drafted by the Washington Nationals in the 20th round of the 2017 Major League Baseball draft.

Amateur career
Cousins grew up St. Charles, Illinois, and attended Wheaton Academy. He attended the University of Pennsylvania and played college baseball for the Penn Quakers for four seasons. As a senior, Cousins had a 7–2 win–loss record with a 3.15 earned run average (ERA) and was named first team All-Ivy League. His all-time collegiate career record was 20–7 with a 2.91 ERA. In 2015, he played collegiate summer baseball for the Harwich Mariners of the Cape Cod Baseball League.

Professional career

Washington Nationals
Cousins was selected in the 20th round, 613th overall, of the 2017 Major League Baseball draft by the Washington Nationals. He made his professional debut with the GCL Nationals in 2017, and also played with the Low-A Auburn Doubledays, accumulating a 2–2 record and 2.48 ERA in 18 appearances. He only played in 7 games for the GCL Nationals in 2018, posting a 4.09 ERA in 11.0 innings of work. On March 27, 2019, Cousins was released after suffering an injury.

Schaumburg Boomers
On May 24, 2019, Cousins signed with the Schaumburg Boomers of the independent Frontier League. Cousins made 15 relief appearances for the Boomers and had a stellar 0.47 ERA with 18 strikeouts.

Milwaukee Brewers
Cousins's performance caught the attention of the Milwaukee Brewers organization, who purchased his contract from Schaumburg on July 17, 2019.  After signing with the Brewers, Cousins was assigned to the Arizona League Brewers Blue before being promoted to the Class A Wisconsin Timber Rattlers. In 14 games between the AZL Brewers and Wisconsin, Cousins posted a cumulative 3–0 record and 1.91 ERA with 39 strikeouts in 28.1 innings of work. After the 2020 minor league season was canceled, he returned to independent baseball with permission from the Brewers and signed with the Chicago Dogs of the American Association of Professional Baseball on July 19, 2020. Cousins made 15 appearances with Chicago and finished the season with a 3.38 ERA. He began the 2021 season with the Double-A Biloxi Shuckers and was promoted to the Triple-A Nashville Sounds after eight appearances. 

On June 21, 2021, Cousins was selected to the 40-man roster and promoted to the major leagues for the first time. Cousins had logged a 2.55 ERA in 16 games between Biloxi and Nashville prior to his call-up. He made his MLB debut that day, pitching two scoreless innings of relief against the Arizona Diamondbacks. In the game, he notched his first career strikeout, punching out Diamondbacks catcher Stephen Vogt, one of 5 K's on the night. On July 7, Cousins earned his first career win after pitching a scoreless inning in relief against the New York Mets. Cousins did not allow an earned run until his 18th pitching appearance.

On June 2, 2022, Cousins was placed on the 60-day injured list with an ulnar collateral ligament injury in his right elbow. He had turned down Tommy John surgery and received a platelet-rich plasma injection a few weeks earlier.

Personal life
Cousins married his high school sweetheart Kelsey Ridderhoff on December 16, 2017, in Beach Park, Illinois. Jake is a cousin of current Minnesota Vikings quarterback Kirk Cousins. Jake grew up a fan of the Chicago Cubs and attended high school at Wheaton Academy in West Chicago, Illinois.

References

External links

Penn Quakers bio

1994 births
Living people
Sportspeople from Park Ridge, Illinois
Baseball players from Illinois
Major League Baseball pitchers
Milwaukee Brewers players
Penn Quakers baseball players
Harwich Mariners players
Gulf Coast Nationals players
Auburn Doubledays players
Arizona League Brewers players
Wisconsin Timber Rattlers players
Schaumburg Boomers players
Chicago Dogs players
Biloxi Shuckers players
Nashville Sounds players